Zig-Zag is a 1975 French film directed by László Szabó and starring Catherine Deneuve and Bernadette Lafont.

Plot 
Marie and Pauline are two cabaret singers in the Pigalle entertainment district of Paris and are highly sought after as the stars of the "Zig Zig" cabaret number. Their admirers include Monsieur Jean, a wealthy retired police commissioner. Little by little, the couple of friends begins to receive "reservations" from regular customers at the bar of ex-boxer Aldo Minelli. There they prostite themselves to save money to create a secure future, dreaming of buying a chalet in the mountains.

However, unbeknownst to Marie, Pauline works with a gang of transvestites who kidnap the wife of the Minister of Agriculture. Marie discovers that Pauline is involved and call outs her friend for becoming a criminal. While the inspector assigned to the case, Inspector Bruyère, is in the dark on the case and his wife is cheating on him with the security guard Edelweiss, Monsieur Jean finally finds and identifies the minister's wife and solves the case. Pauline, however, is murdered shortly afterwards by the tramp Walter, who is in love with her and wants revenge. Monsieur Jean in turn kills Pauline's killer and runs towards Marie, who is holding her friend's lifeless body in her arms.

Cast 

 Catherine Deneuve as Marie
 Bernadette Lafont as Pauline
 Walter Chiari as Walter, the tramp
 Stéphane Shandor as Inspector Bruyère
 Jean-Pierre Kalfon as Guitarist
 Georgette Anys as Singer
 Jean-Pierre Maud as Edelweiss
 Hubert Deschamps as Monsieur Jean

Production 
Catherine Deneuve said it was one of the most chaotic shoots she had ever experienced, with director László Szabó constantly drunk on set.

References

External links 
 

French crime films
French drama films